Vostochnoye (Könsığış) is a rural locality (a selo) in Buzdyaksky Selsoviet, Buzdyaksky District, Bashkortostan, Russia. The population was 421 as of 2010. There are 7 streets.

Geography 
Vostochnoye is located 12 km north of Buzdyak (the district's administrative centre) by road. Stary Buzdyak is the nearest rural locality.

References 

Rural localities in Buzdyaksky District